Senga Hill is a constituency of the National Assembly of Zambia. It covers the towns of Nendo and Senga Hill in Senga Hill District of the Northern Province. The constituency is home to the Mambwe and Lungu people of Zambia.

List of MPs

References

Constituencies of the National Assembly of Zambia
1973 establishments in Zambia
Constituencies established in 1973